Lady Lake may refer to:

 Lady Lake (Vancouver Island), a lake on British Columbia's Vancouver Island
 Lady Lake, Florida, a town in Lake County, Florida, United States
 Lady Lake (Minnesota), a lake
 Lady Lake, Saskatchewan, a hamlet in the Canadian province of Saskatchewan
 Lady Lake (album), an album by Gnidrolog